George Hume Macartney, born George Hume (1793–1869)  of Lissanoure, County Antrim was an Irish politician.

In 1814 Hume assumed the surname Macartney under the will of his granduncle, George Macartney, 1st Earl Macartney. He was Conservative MP for Antrim from 1852 to 1858.

References

External links 
 

1793 births
1869 deaths
Members of the Parliament of the United Kingdom for County Antrim constituencies (1801–1922)
UK MPs 1852–1857
UK MPs 1857–1859
Irish Conservative Party MPs
People from County Antrim